The 1911 Georgetown Blue and Gray football team represented Georgetown University during the 1911 college football season. Led by Fred K. Nielsen in his second year as head coach, the team went 7–1–1, the champion among the South Atlantic teams. The team was led at quarterback by Harry Costello.

Schedule

References

Georgetown
Georgetown Hoyas football seasons
Georgetown Blue and Gray football